Elo Hansen is a retired male badminton player from Denmark who won international titles in all three events (singles, doubles, and mixed doubles) from the late 1960s through the mid-1970s.

Career
Hansen won the gold medal at the 1970 European Badminton Championships in men's doubles with Per Walsøe and the silver medal in singles in the same tournament. He was a singles silver medalist again at the European Championships in 1976. A highly impressive shotmaker, Hansen played in four consecutive Thomas Cup (men's international team) campaigns for Denmark, ('66–'67, '69–'70, '72–'73, '75–'76), but never overtook his contemporary, Svend Pri, as Denmark's leading player of that era. Hansen's international singles titles included the French Open (1969), the Dutch Open (1970), the Swedish Open (1971), the Norwegian International (1973), and the Portugal International (1974). His finest moment in badminton probably came in Denmark's narrow (4–5) 1970 Thomas Cup semi-final loss to defending champion Malaysia in Kuala Lumpur when he defeated both Tan Aik Huang and Punch Gunalan in straight games.

Achievements

International tournaments 
Men's doubles

References 

Danish male badminton players
Living people
Year of birth missing (living people)